The 1910 NYU Violets football team was an American football team that represented New York University as an independent during the 1910 college football season. In their fourth year under head coach Herman Olcott, the team compiled a 2–4–1 record.

Schedule

References

NYU
NYU Violets football seasons
NYU Violets football